Burrilanka is situated in East Godavari district in Andhra Pradesh State.

References

Villages in East Godavari district